The Redondo Beach Original Townsite Historic District is a  area that was listed on the National Register of Historic Places listings in Los Angeles County, California on June 30, 1988.

It is approximately five blocks from what was once considered to be downtown Redondo Beach: 300 block North Gertruda Ave., 505-507-509-511 North Guadalupe Avenue, 512-610-612-614 Carnelian Street and 625 Diamond Street.

Although seemingly small in area, the entire present-day area of Redondo Beach was recorded in 2019 by the United States Census Bureau to encompass only 6.20 sq mi (16.06 km2) of land and 0.01 sq mi (0.03 km2) of water.

References

Historic districts on the National Register of Historic Places in California
 
South Bay, Los Angeles
Cities in Los Angeles County, California
Incorporated cities and towns in California
Populated coastal places in California
Populated places established in 1892